Thomas Chamberlayne may refer to:

Sir Thomas Chamberlayne (judge) (died 1625), English judge who served as Chief Justice of Chester
Sir Thomas Chamberlayne, 1st Baronet (died 1643), of Wickham, Oxfordshire supported the Royalist cause in the English Civil War. He was Sheriff of Oxfordshire in 1643
Sir Thomas Chamberlayne, 2nd Baronet (c. 1635–1682), one of few men to receive a renewal of the baronetcy from the Lord Protector Oliver Cromwell
Thomas Chamberlayne (cricketer) (1805–1876), English cricketer and yachtsman
Thomas Chamberlayne (priest), Dean of Bristol, 1739–1757

See also
Thomas Chamberlain (disambiguation)
Chamberlayne (disambiguation)